Eddie Paul (May 30, 1948 – July 12, 2016) was the owner of E.P. Industries, Inc and held multiple U.S. patents. He was born in San Francisco, California, and resided in El Segundo. E.P. Industries included Prototech Machine Engineering, a CNC machine shop (no longer in business).

He was known for the creation of customized vehicles for use in Hollywood feature films. His work was seen in such movies as Grease, The Fast and the Furious,Taxi, XXX and Gone in 60 Seconds. He created custom vehicles which toured as Pixar characters Lightning McQueen, Mater and Sally to promote the 2006 animated film Cars.

Eddie has also done work for TV shows such as The Dukes of Hazzard.

Eddie worked as a stuntman for several years, performing stunts in Ice Pirates and Streets of Fire.

Inventions

Eddie Paul held US patents for:
 C.E.M. engine (US patent 6145429), a pump that is used by some fire departments.
 Steering control system for trailers (US patent 6273446), a steerable trailer is provided with a trailer hitch which extends forward to attach to a corresponding hitch on the towing vehicle.
 Method and apparatus for producing stereoscopic images with single sensor (US patent 5883695),

Eddie designed and created a mechanical shark for Jean-Michel Cousteau and later created another shark for Fabien Cousteau.

References

External links
 DeadlineTV
 

1948 births
2016 deaths
20th-century American inventors
Businesspeople from San Francisco
20th-century American businesspeople
21st-century American businesspeople
American stunt performers